is an adventure game designed by Kaz Ayabe, who is known in Japan for the popular Boku no Natsuyasumi series. The game was released for Nintendo 3DS in Japan on March 13, 2013 as part of the Guild02 compilation, and separately as a digital download in North America, Europe and Australasia on July 18, 2013. It follows a boy named Sohta, who lives in a town where monsters and superheroes from 1970s tokusatsu shows appear every Friday.

Gameplay 
In the game, the player explores the town which the protagonist Sohta has just moved to, with gameplay consisting of speaking to NPCs to progress the plot and playing card battles against other residents. Sohta must collect "glims", energy shards that allow him to magically obtain new cards.

Plot 
The game's plot is structured in 26 episodes and takes place in 1971 in Setagaya, Tokyo, in the suburb of Fuji no Hana. It starts with the ten year old Sohta, who has recently moved into town and whose parents own a dry-cleaning shop, being sent on an errand but forgetting about it. As he ventures through town, he meets various classmates, against whom he plays a trading-card game called "Monster Cards", and other residents. The episodes are non-linear and involve individual quests.

The overarching story of the game is presented in a magic realist manner, and involves the sudden and inexplicable appearance of massive fictional superheroes and kaiju that battle every Friday outside of town. As a tokusatsu show is also filmed in the same town, it is unclear whether it is a supernatural phenomenon or a giant hoax orchestrated by the townspeople.

Reception 

The game received "generally favorable reviews" according to the review aggregation website Metacritic.

Jonathan Holmes of Destructoid praised the game for its relaxing gameplay and "beautiful artwork". Comparing it to work by Studio Ghibli, he also called the card minigame "surprisingly gripping", saying it was a good example of a short yet fun narrative game. Lee Meyer of Nintendo Life called it "a lovely, memorable experience" that resembled a classic coming-of-age film. Comparing the episodes to the Professor Layton series in how they are structured, he also called the game "visually and aurally pleasing". Griffin McElroy of Polygon called its writing, narration, art, and sound design "superb", but criticized the glim collecting as "needlessly repetitive".

References

External links 
 

Guild (video game series)
2013 video games
Adventure games
Level-5 (company) games
Nintendo 3DS games
Nintendo 3DS-only games
Single-player video games
Tokusatsu video games
Video games about children
Video games developed in Japan
Video games set in the 1970s
Video games set in Tokyo
Millennium Kitchen games